İlayda Civelek (born 6 July 1998) is a Turkish women's football midfielder, who plays in the First League for Galatasaray  with jersey number 23. She played for the Turkey women's U-19 team before she was admitted to the Turkey women's team .

Club career

Amasya Eğitim Spor 
Civelek obtained her license from her hometown club Amasya Eğitim Spor on 14 October 2011. She became top scorer in the 2015–16 Women's Second league season with 19 goals sharing the title with Başak Gündoğdu of Beşiktaş J.K.

Beşiktaş 
After playing five seasons with the team, she was transferred by the Istanbul-based club Beşiktaş J.K., which was recently promoted to the First League.

Ataşehir Belediyespor 
By October 2017, she transferred to Ataşehir Belediyespor.

Kireçburnu Spor 
The next season, she transferred to Kireçburnu Spor.

Ataşehir Belediyespor 
However, after the first half of the 2018-19 First League season, she returned to her former club Ataşehir Belediyespor.

ALG Spor 
By October 2020, Civelek transferred to the 2019-20 Women's First League top team, which were entitled to participate at the 2020–21 UEFA Women's Champions League qualifying round. She debuted at the UEFA Women's Champions League playing in the 2020–21 UEFA Women's Champions League qualifying round against the Albanian team KFF Vllaznia Shkodër in Shkodër, Albania on 3 November 2020, and scored one goal. She enjoyed the 2021-22 Women's Super League champion title of her team.

Galatasaray 
On 10 August 2022, she transferred to the Women's Super League club Galatasaray.

International career 
Turkey girls' U-17
She played with her school team of Amasya Girls' Sports High School at the 2015 ISF World Tournament held in Guatemala. She scored four goals in one game, setting a record.

Turkeywomen's U-19
She was admitted to the Turkey girls' national U-15 team debuting in the friendly match against Belarus and scoring one goal. Between 2013 and 2015, she capped in 23 matches of the Turkey women's national U-17 team and scored four goals. Civelek entered the Turkey women's national U-19 team to play in the 2105 UEFA Development Tournament. She took part at the qualification matches of the 2017 UEFA Women's Under-19 Championship in 2016 and 2017.

Turkey women's
Civelek was admitted to the Turkey women's team, and debuted internationally in the UEFA Women's Euro 2022 qualifying Group A against Slovenia on 18 September 2020.

Career statistics 
.

Honours

Club 
 Turkish Women's First Football League
 Beşiktaş J.K.
 Runners-up (1): 2016–17

 ALG Spor
 Winners (1): 2021-22
 Third places (1): 2020–21

Individual 
 Turkish Women's Second League
 Top scorer (1): 2015–16 with Amasya Eğitim Spor (19 goals).

References

External links 

1998 births
Living people
People from Amasya
Turkish women's footballers
Women's association football midfielders
Beşiktaş J.K. women's football players
Ataşehir Belediyespor players
Kireçburnu Spor players
ALG Spor players
Turkish Women's Football Super League players
Turkey women's youth international footballers
Turkey women's international footballers
Galatasaray S.K. women's football players
21st-century Turkish sportswomen